"Stressed Out" is a 2015 song by Twenty One Pilots.

Stressed Out may also refer to:
 "Stressed out", the condition of suffering from psychological stress

TV
 "Stressed Out", a 1990 episode of Degrassi High
 "Stressed Out", a 2010 episode of Launch My Line

Music

 "Stressed Out", a 1995 song by Merrill Nisker from Fancypants Hoodlum
 "Stressed Out" (A Tribe Called Quest song), 1996
 "Stressed Out", a 2001 song by Babyface from Face2Face
 "Stressed Out", a 2007 song by Anna Abreu from Anna Abreu